This is a comparison of notable YouTube download and conversion software. YouTube conversion software is used to download and convert YouTube videos to popular formats or portable devices.

Features

Built-in conversion to formats and devices

Supported operating systems

See also

 BitTorrent client
 Comparison of file sharing applications
 Comparison of download managers

References 

YouTube
Network software comparisons